"A Lie" is a song recorded by Moroccan-American rapper French Montana featuring Canadian singer the Weeknd and American rapper Max B. The song was written by French Montana, the Weeknd, Rory Quigley, Jason Quenneville, Danny Schofield, Charly Wingate, Matt Carillo, Fred Lowinger, Russ Mitkowski and Matthew Quenones, while the production was handled by Harry Fraud, DaHeala, DannyBoyStyles and Masar. The song was serviced to rhythmic radio on August 15, 2017, as the album's third single. The single peaked at number 75 on the US Billboard Hot 100.

Music video
The music video for "A Lie"  premiered on July 14, 2017, on French Montana's Vevo account on YouTube. The video was shot in New York City, New York and was directed by French Montana and Spiff TV with cameos done by Belly, A$AP Rocky, Juelz Santana and Nav. The music video has surpassed over 30 million views on YouTube.

Charts

Certifications

Release history

References

2017 singles
2017 songs
French Montana songs
Bad Boy Records singles
Songs written by French Montana
The Weeknd songs
Songs written by the Weeknd
Songs written by DaHeala